Barvanan-e Gharbi Rural District is in Torkamanchay District of Mianeh County, East Azerbaijan province, Iran. At the National Census of 2006, its population was 5,679 in 1,262 households. There were 4,472 inhabitants in 1,279 households at the following census of 2011. At the most recent census of 2016, the population of the rural district was 4,132 in 1,412 households. The largest of its 22 villages was Kalhor, with 779 people.

References 

Meyaneh County

Rural Districts of East Azerbaijan Province

Populated places in East Azerbaijan Province

Populated places in Meyaneh County